Helmut Hentrich (17 June 1905 – 7 February 2001) was a German architect who became particularly known for his striking high-rise buildings in the 1960s and 1970s. The architectural firm he founded, Hentrich, Petschnigg und Partner (HPP), still exists under the name .

Life

Education 
Born in Krefeld, Hentrich was the son of the civil engineer Hubert Hentrich.

After graduating from high school, Hentrich initially gave in to his father's urging and began studying law at the Albert Ludwigs University of Freiburg in Breisgau in 1922, but switched to the architecture faculty of the Vienna University of Technology in 1924 and a year later to the Technical University of Berlin to study under Hans Poelzig, Heinrich Tessenow and Hermann Jansen.

In Berlin, Hentrich became acquainted with modern architecture, which was on the rise, and worked in the architectural offices of Hugo Häring and Ludwig Mies van der Rohe during semester breaks, but it was above all Hans Poelzig who shaped his understanding of architecture. During his studies in Berlin, he met Albert Speer,  and Rudolf Wolters, who also studied there. Hentrich passed his diploma main examination with distinction in 1928.

1929 until 1945 
After graduating, Hentrich began a Referendariat in 1929. (as Regierungsbauführer) in order to qualify for civil service.
He worked as a construction supervisor on the reconstruction of the Andreaskirche in Düsseldorf's old town.

In the early 1930s he worked in Paris in the architectural practice of Ernő Goldfinger and in New York City in the architectural practice of Norman Bel Geddes and travelled extensively in the US, China, India and other countries.

Returning to Germany, Hentrich passed the second state examination to become a government architect (assessor) in 1933. He was to take up a position in the state building construction office Gussew (East Prussia), but chose the path of self-employment and opened an architectural office in Düsseldorf in the same year.

Both won a competition for the Orsoy Deichtor in 1937 and increasingly took part in official competitions of the Organisation Todt or the Hitler Youth. The year before, Hentrich had already been accepted as a member of the Academy for Urban, Reich and Regional Planning. In 1938, he was represented at the Second German Architecture Exhibition of the National Socialists in the Munich Haus der Kunst with the Reichsautobahn-Rasthof Rhynern.

In 1941-1945, Hentrich was a member of the National Socialist German Workers' Party. In the final phase of World War II, Hentrich was included by Hitler in the Gottbegnadeten list of the most important architects, which saved him from wartime service.

Hentrich wrote in his memoirs (Bauzeit. Aufzeichnungen aus dem Leben eines Architekten. Düsseldorf 1995,) about his work in the so-called Third Reich: "The interesting work on these buildings was always only factual and never coloured by political aspects." He carried out commissions for the Organisation Todt.

After 1945 

"In fact, Düsseldorf is becoming a centre of former Nazi prominence," the architects' association formulated in a memorandum.
Despite these objections, Hentrich - an honorary member of the cultural committee of the city of Düsseldorf - was able to participate in the reconstruction plans for the city; his architectural office shaped the appearance of the inner city with representative banks and administrative buildings. It certainly helped that Hentrich's student friend Friedrich Tamms was head of the city planning office and Julius Schulte-Frohlinde had been head of the structural engineering office of the city of Düsseldorf since 1952. After the death of Hans Heuser in 1953, Hentrich took Hubert Petschnigg into the architectural office.

While Hentrich's commercial buildings of the early post-war period still had strong echoes of the neoclassicism of the 1930s, later Hentrich's buildings were characterised by the International Style with its cool objectivity determined by glass and steel.
Hentrich gained worldwide recognition with the construction of the Dreischeibenhaus from 1957 to 1960; with its significant appearance, the building is still one of the best-known and most important high-rise buildings in Germany. In 1969, the office partnership was expanded by six partners and renamed HPP Hentrich-Petschnigg & Partner. HPP subsequently won numerous competitions and developed into one of the largest architectural firms of the post-war period, specialising in the field of administrative buildings. In 13 cities in West Germany and South Africa, their large office built a total of more than 40 high-rise buildings.

In addition, Hentrich was chairman of the board of the Malkasten in Düsseldorf 1945-1955.

In 1960, Hentrich was appointed professor by the state government of North Rhine-Westphalia.

In 1972, the office partnership was transformed into a limited partnership. Two years later, Hentrich and Petschnigg transferred the management of the office to their two partners Hans Joachim Stutz and Rüdiger Thoma. They themselves retired to the office's advisory board, but continued to participate in the various projects.

Hentrich owned an important collection of antique and Islamic glass art, as well as Art Nouveau and Art Nouveau objects; this collection was donated to the Museum Kunstpalast as Glasmuseum Hentrich in 1963.

Hentrich died in Düsseeldorf at the age of 95.

Realisations 
 1934–1935: Einfamilienhaus für Schmitz-Egelhoff in Krefeld.
 1935–1936:  in Düsseldorf, Scheibenstraße / Inselstraße 34 (with Hans Heuser)
 1937–1938: Hitlerjugend-Heim in Rheinhausen, Werthauser Straße (with Hans Heuser).
 1937: Musterhaus zur Reichsausstellung Schaffendes Volk for sculptor Hellwig Reiss-Schmidt (b. 1904) in der Künstlersiedlung Schlageterstadt (today Golzheimer settlement), Franz-Jürgens-Straße 10
 1937–1938: Deichtor in Orsoy (with Hans Heuser).
 1938–1939: Jugendheim in Hilden
 1938: Jagdhaus Brandt in Brandenberg (Hürtgenwald).
 vor 1939: Einfamilienhaus für Dr. Rohde in Düsseldorf.
 vor 1939: Haus für Dr. Blassendorf in Meerbusch.
 vor 1939: Fünffamilienhaus für Poensgen in Düsseldorf, Rheinallee (with Hans Heuser).
 vor 1943: Haus Ö. [Oetker] in Krefeld (with Hans Heuser).
 1949: Werkswohnungen (Zwei Doppelhäuser) für FA Kümpers in Rheine, Basilikastraße (with Hans Heuser)
 1949–1950: HSBC Trinkaus in Düsseldorf
 1949–1953: Gerling-Hochhaus in Cologne (Entwurf with Hans Heuser, Änderungen durch Hans Gerling).
 1951–1952:  in Düsseldorf (with Hans Heuser)
 1952–1953:  in Pempelfort, Jägerhofstraße 29 (with Hans Heuser)
 1952–1953:  in Düsseldorf-Pempelfort, Kaiserstraße 42
 1952: Bankhaus  in Düsseldorf (with Hans Heuser)
 1953–1954: Christuskirche in Düren
 1954: Hentrichhaus, Malkasten, Düsseldorf-Pempelfort
 1954–1957: Friedrich-Engelhorn-Hochhaus in Ludwigshafen
 1955–1956: evangelische Petruskirche in Düsseldorf-Unterrath
 1956: Aula der Rheinischen Friedrich-Wilhelms-Universität Bonn
 1957–1960: Bürohochhaus für die Phoenix-Rheinrohr AG (genannt Dreischeibenhaus or Thyssen-Haus) in Düsseldorf
 1960–1961: ehemaliges Kasino R 55 (Werkskantine) des Bayer-Werks Krefeld-Uerdingen (with Hubert Petschnigg), unter Denkmalschutz 2020 auf Antrag des Eigentümers abgerissen
 1960–1963: Bayer-Hochhaus in Leverkusen.
 1958–1960: BAT-Hochhaus in Hamburg
 1961–1964: Unilever-Haus in Hamburg (today Emporio-Hochhaus)
 1961–1964: KHD-Hochhaus (now trade fair tower) in Cologne
 1962–1970: Construction of the Westdeutscher Rundfunk in Cologne
 before 1963: Kaufhaus Merkur in Neuss.
 before 1963: High-rise residential buildings on Dorotheenstrasse in Hamburg.
 1963–1964: Europa-Center in Charlottenburg
 1963–1972: Overall planning and institute building of the Ruhr University Bochum.
 1964–1965: Protestant Dietrich-Bonhoeffer-Kirche in Düsseldorf-Garath
 1967–1968: Administration building, Rheinallee 9, Düsseldorf-Heerdt ((staff polygon, protected))
 1967–1970: Verwaltungszentrum für Procter & Gamble in Schwalbach am Taunus
 1968–1970: Hauptverwaltung für Rank Xerox in Düsseldorf
 1963–1966:  an der Esplanade in Hamburg
 1965–1970: Standard Bank Center in Johannesburg
 1970–1974: Hauptverwaltung des TÜV Rheinland e. V. in Köln-Poll
 1971–1974: Diamond Sorting Building in Kimberley, Northern Cape
 1972–1975:  in Düsseldorf, Königsallee / Trinkausstraße
 1971–1974: RWI-Haus in Düsseldorf
 1973–1974: Haus Hentrich in Düsseldorf
 1973–1976: Head office of the Rheinbraun in Cologne
 1973–1978 and 2005: Tonhalle Düsseldorf
 1977–1981: Marriott Riyadh Hotel in Saudi Arabia
 1977–1980: Ministry of the Interior of the State of North Rhine-Westphalia in Düsseldorf
 1978: Erweiterungsbau für das Fernmeldeamt Düsseldorf 1, Königsallee.
 1979–1981: Sheraton Hotel in Essen
 1980–1983: Forum Hotel in Mecca, Saudi Arabia
 1980–1983: Handelsblatthaus in Düsseldorf
 1981: .
 1987: Zweit-Auslands-Telephone exchange in Frankfurt-Nied.
 1988–1993: Trianon-Hochhaus of the BfG  in Frankfurt
 1990–1992: 
 1993–1996: Haus des Buches in Leipzig
 1993–1996: Restoration and conversion of the "Tobacco Mosque" (former Yenidze cigarette factory) in Dresden
 1994–1998: M. DuMont Schauberg-Haus in Cologne
 1994–1995: Eurotower in Frankfurt
 1995: Postamt Bielefeld 1.
 1997–2001: Arena AufSchalke in Gelsenkirchen
 1997–2000: Refurbishment and conversion of the Detlev-Rohwedder-Haus of the Federal Ministry of Finance in Berlin
 2010: Facade conversion on "maxCologne" (former Lufthansa high-rise) in Cologne

References

Further reading 
 Gudrun Escher: Pragmatiker zuerst. Helmut Hentrich 1905–2001. In DBZ 4/2001, 
 Helmut Hentrich: Bauzeit. Aufzeichnungen aus dem Leben eines Architekten. Düsseldorf, 1995.
 Henry-Russell Hitchcock: HPP Hentrich-Petschnigg & Partner. Düsseldorf, 1973.
 HPP Hentrich-Petschnigg & Partner: 50 Jahre HPP. Düsseldorf, 1985.
 Sabine Tünkers: Hentrich, Heuser, Petschnigg 1927–1955. Weimar, 2000.
 Klaus-Dieter Weiß: Architektenporträt Helmut Hentrich. Perfektion versus Philosophie? In Der Architekt 1/1986, 
 Agnes Wolf: Helmut Hentrich. In Allgemeines Künstlerlexikon. Die Bildenden Künstler aller Zeiten und Völker (AKL). Vol. 72, de Gruyter, Berlin 2012,

External links 

 
 
 Architekten-Porträt Helmut Hentrich
 Helmut-Hentrich-Archiv im Archiv der Academy of Arts, Berlin
 Welt.de: Bauen schwule Männer anders? (german)

20th-century German architects
Architects in the Nazi Party
Architecture firms of Germany
Commanders Crosses of the Order of Merit of the Federal Republic of Germany
1905 births
2001 deaths
People from Krefeld
German LGBT people